Nikica Košutić (born 7 December 1985) is a Serbian football forward who plays in Norway for Medkila.

External links
 
 

1985 births
Living people
Footballers from Belgrade
Association football forwards
Serbian footballers
FK Zemun players
FK Beograd players
FK Bežanija players
PFC Chernomorets Burgas players
FK Radnički Nova Pazova players
FK Inđija players
Anagennisi Karditsa F.C. players
Al-Hazem F.C. players
Iraklis Psachna F.C. players
Fokikos A.C. players
Harstad IL players
Medkila IL (men) players
Serbian SuperLiga players
First Professional Football League (Bulgaria) players
Saudi Professional League players
Serbian expatriate footballers
Serbian expatriate sportspeople in Bulgaria
Serbian expatriate sportspeople in Greece
Expatriate footballers in Bulgaria
Expatriate footballers in Greece
Expatriate footballers in Saudi Arabia
Expatriate footballers in Norway